Crilley is an Irish surname.

Notable people with this surname include:

 Frank William Crilley (1883–1947), American diver
 Mark Crilley (born 1966), American manga artist
 Willie Crilley (1903–1955), Scottish footballer

See also 
 Crilly (disambiguation)

References